Thomas Alan Greene is an American politician who served in the Louisiana Senate from 1992 to 2000.

He studied at Louisiana State University.

References

1948 births
Living people
Louisiana Democrats
Louisiana Republicans
Louisiana state senators
Louisiana State University alumni
Place of birth missing (living people)